Kendel Carson (born ) is a Canadian singer and fiddler. She performs with the folk music band The Paperboys, but is best known internationally as a roots/country solo artist. In late 2012, Carson joined The Beautiful Beautiful Band (formerly known as "The Beautiful Gypsies") with Alan Doyle, the band Doyle started after the dissolution of his long-standing "Great Big Sea." She continues to tour, perform, and record with Doyle and The Beautiful Beautiful Band.

Life and career
She was born in Calgary, Alberta, and at the age of seven she moved with her family to Victoria, British Columbia. She started to play the violin at age three. She studied classical music, and at age twelve she and her brother Tyler Carson were regular soloists for a children's concert series with the Victoria Symphony. In 2003, she played with the National Youth Orchestra of Canada.

Along with her interest in classical music, she and her brother enjoyed other genres of music and they performed as buskers on the streets of Victoria. She once played an impromptu fiddle accompaniment for Spirit of the West. Following her stint with the Youth Orchestra, she joined the Celtic rock group The Paperboys in Vancouver on the strength of her experience with Spirit of the West. She also performed with Spirit of the West at several shows in 2012 when regular member Geoffrey Kelly was ill.

Later, at an outdoor concert with The Paperboys, she met Chip Taylor, the noted songwriter famous for such songs as "Angel of the Morning", and he became her mentor, musical partner, and producer. With Taylor, she has developed her vocal talents along with her fiddling. She records for Taylor's Train Wreck Records, and they have performed together in North America and in Europe.

Her first album with Taylor, Rearview Mirror Tears was named by Q Magazine as one of the five best roots albums of 2007. XM Radio declared it one of the top ten country albums of the year.

She also records and performs with Stephanie Cadman and Miranda Mulholland in a country music trio called Belle Starr. For the past several years she has also performed with Barney Bentall and the Grand Cariboo Opry. In 2013, she became a member of the Alan Doyle Band in support of his solo album Boy on Bridge (2012). Carson does not appear on the album itself.  She does, however, appear on Alan Doyle's next three albums: "So Let's Go" (2015), "A Week at the Warehouse" (2017) and "Rough Side Out" (2020).

She lists Janis Joplin, Lucinda Williams, The Band, and Emmylou Harris among her many influences.

Discography

Solo
Rearview Mirror Tears (debut, 2006)
Alright Dynamite (2009)
The Lost Tapes of Suzanna Hamilton (2018)
The Calgary Sessions (2018)

with Belle Starr
The Burning of Atlanta (EP, 2012)
Belle Starr (2013)

with Outlaw Social
 a seven-song e.p. (2006)
 Dry Bones (2007)

with Alan Doyle
 So Let's Go (2015) 
 A Week at the Warehouse (2017) 
 Rough Side Out (2020)

References

1980s births
Living people
Canadian women singer-songwriters
Canadian folk fiddlers
Musicians from Calgary
21st-century Canadian women singers
21st-century Canadian violinists and fiddlers
Canadian women violinists and fiddlers